Esporte Clube Rio Verde, commonly known as Rio Verde, is a Brazilian football club based in Rio Verde, Goiás state.

History
Esporte Clube Rio Verde was founded on August 22, 1963. The club won the Campeonato Goiano in 1969, 1982, 1989, and in 1993.

Achievements

Campeonato Goiano Second Division:
 Winners (6): 1969, 1982, 1989, 1993, 2011, 2016

Stadium
Esporte Clube Rio Verde play their home games at Estádio Mozart Veloso do Carmo. The stadium has a maximum capacity of 8,000 people.

References

 
Association football clubs established in 1963
1963 establishments in Brazil